Liavol-e Olya (also Romanized as Līāvol-e ‘Olyā and Liyavol Olya; also known as Līāvā Bālā, Liavalbala, Līāvol Bālā, Līāvol-e Bālā, and Liāwalbāla) is a village in Dolfak Rural District, Khorgam District, Rudbar County, Gilan Province, Iran. At the 2006 census, its population was 303, in 92 families.

References 

Populated places in Rudbar County